The Thomas Center, formerly known as Hotel Thomas and Sunkist Villa, is an historic building in Gainesville, Florida, United States. It was built starting in 1910 in the Classical Revival style by noted Atlanta-based architect, William Augustus Edwards, designer of academic buildings at 12 institutions in Georgia, South Carolina and Florida, including the original University of Florida campus, as well as a dozen or more county courthouses in those states plus other building and houses,

The building began as the private home of William Reuben Thomas, his wife Kathryn, and their five children, when it was known as Sunkist Villa. In 1928 Thomas more than doubled the size of the home and converted it to a hotel.  On July 16, 1973, the building was added to the U.S. National Register of Historic Places.

The Thomas Center celebrated its 100th anniversary on February 12, 2010.

Thomas Center
Today the Thomas Center serves as a local art and cultural center, and is the home for the Gainesville Cultural Affairs Division.  The Thomas Center Galleries feature changing exhibits of art.  The center also features 1920s period rooms, local history exhibits, a performance space, banquet rooms, and meeting rooms.

References

External links

 Gainesville Division of Cultural Affairs - Thomas Center - official site
 Alachua County listings at Florida's Office of Cultural and Historical Programs
 Virtual tour of Northeast Historic District, Gainesville
 The Historic Thomas Center in Gainesville, FL
 The Thomas Center at Historic Homes of Greater Gainesville
 A Gainesville, Florida Gem

Buildings and structures in Gainesville, Florida
National Register of Historic Places in Gainesville, Florida
William Augustus Edwards buildings
Museums in Gainesville, Florida
Historic house museums in Florida
Art museums and galleries in Florida
1910 establishments in Florida